Major General William Edward Blewitt,  (24 September 1854 – 18 April 1939) was a British artillery officer. Blewitt joined the Royal Artillery as a first lieutenant on 12 February 1874, was promoted to captain on 1 August 1883, and to major on 14 March 1891. He served during the Second Boer War where he was Mentioned in despatches twice, and was promoted to lieutenant-colonel on 13 February 1900. In 1901 he was a member of the Ordnance Committee. He commanded the Southern Coast Defences, 1911–1914; and the Portsmouth Garrison, 1914–1916 during the First World War.

References 

1854 births
1939 deaths
Royal Artillery officers
British Army personnel of the Second Boer War
British Army personnel of World War I
Companions of the Order of the Bath
Companions of the Order of St Michael and St George
Commanders of the Order of the British Empire
British Army major generals